Gods of the Lightning was a 1928 Broadway three-act drama written by Maxwell Anderson and 
Harold Hickerson, produced by Hamilton MacFadden and Kellogg Gary and staged by MacFadden. It ran for 29 performances from October 24, 1928 to November 1928 at the Little Theatre. The Sacco-Vanzetti case was the play's inspiration, Charles Bickford in the Sacco character role.
Anderson later wrote an updated Sacco-Vanzetti play named Winterset.

Cast

 Morris Ankrum as Spiker	
 Jules Artfield as Heine	
 Charles Bickford as Macready	
 Barton MacLane as	Ward
 Sylvia Sidney as Rosalie	
 Horace Braham as Capraro	
 Maynard Burgess as Lubin
 Eva Condon as Mrs. Lubin
 Robert Brister as Salter	
 Leo Bulgakov as Suvorin	
 Del Cleveland as District Attorney asst.  	
 Samuel Coit as Sowerby	
 Edward Cutler as clerk of court	
 Willard Dashiell as Haslet	
 Jules Ferrar as Bauer	
 Benjamin Fesseden as policeman	
 Moss Fleisig as Jerusalem Slim	
 John R. Hamilton as Gluckstein	
 Thomas Kelly as Andy	
 Arthur Pederson as Pete	
 Molly Ricardel as	Salvation Lassie	
 Lloyd Sabine as police sgt. 	
 Sam Silverbush as	Ike	
 Ian Wolfe as Milkin	
 Douglas Wood as Judge Vail
 Harry Bliven as Bartlett
 Henry Engel as Sheriff Henry

References

External links 
 
 Los Angeles Times

1928 plays
Broadway plays
Plays by Maxwell Anderson
Plays set in the United States
Works about Sacco and Vanzetti